The Chinese Elm cultivar Ulmus parvifolia 'Emer I' or 'Emerald Isle' was cloned from a tree planted circa 1920 on the University of Georgia campus at Athens.

Description
Athena is a small tree rarely exceeding 6 m in height, with a slightly broader, dense and rounded crown. The leaves are a medium, glossy green, turning drab brown in autumn. The exfoliating, mottled bark is considered very attractive.

Pests and diseases
The species and its cultivars are highly resistant, but not immune, to Dutch elm disease, and unaffected by the Elm Leaf Beetle Xanthogaleruca luteola. As with the species overall, damage caused by Japanese Beetle is relatively slight.

Cultivation
Athena featured in the elm trials  conducted by Northern Arizona University at Holbrook, Arizona, but was unsuited to the hot, arid climate and sustained over 50% mortality in its first year. It is currently being evaluated in the National Elm Trial  coordinated by Colorado State University. Athena was introduced to Australia in 2002 as part of the Australian Urban Street Planting Programme  ; it is not known to have been introduced to Europe.

Synonymy
? 'Athena Classic' (unchecked name)

Accessions

North America

Bartlett Tree Experts, US. Acc. nos. 96-2159, 2000-076,077,079,081,083,084, 2003-941,942, 00-064, L467, L468.
New York Botanical Garden, US. Acc. no. 3934/95
University of Idaho arboretum, US. One tree. Acc. no. 1998011
U S National Arboretum , Washington, D.C., US. Acc. no. 69142.

Nurseries
North America
(Widely available)
Australasia
Fleming's Nursery , Monbulk, Victoria, Australia.

References

External links
http://www.ces.ncsu.edu/depts/hort/consumer/factsheets/trees-new/cultivars/ulmus_parvifolia.htm Ulmus parvifolia cultivar list.
https://web.archive.org/web/20030413074605/http://fletcher.ces.state.nc.us/programs/nursery/metria/metria11/warren/elm.htm Return of the Elm - the status of elms in the nursery industry in 2000. Warren, K., J. Frank Schmidt and Co.

Chinese elm cultivar
Ulmus articles missing images
Ulmus